The Boeing 717 is an American five-abreast single-aisle airliner produced by Boeing Commercial Airplanes. The twin-engine airliner was developed for the 100-seat market and originally marketed by McDonnell Douglas as the MD-95. It was a shortened derivative of the company's successful airliner, the MD-80, and thus the fourth generation of the DC-9 family. It is powered by two Rolls-Royce BR715 turbofan engines mounted at the rear of the fuselage.

The first order for the airliner was placed with McDonnell Douglas in October 1995 by ValuJet Airlines (later AirTran Airways). With McDonnell Douglas and Boeing merging in 1997 prior to production, the airliner entered service in 1999 as the Boeing 717. Production of the type ceased in May 2006 after 155 were delivered. , 103 Boeing 717 airliners remain in service and have recorded zero fatalities and no hull losses.

Development

Background
Douglas Aircraft launched the DC-9, a short-range companion to its larger four-engine DC-8, in 1963. The DC-9 was an all-new design, using two rear fuselage-mounted Pratt & Whitney JT8D turbofan engines; a small, efficient wing; and a T-tail. The DC-9's maiden flight was in 1965 and entered airline service later that year. When production ended in 1982, a total of 976 DC-9s had been produced.

The McDonnell Douglas MD-80 series, the second generation of the DC-9, began airline service in 1980. It was a lengthened DC-9-50 with a higher maximum take-off weight (MTOW) and higher fuel capacity, as well as next-generation Pratt and Whitney JT8D-200 series engines and an improved wing design. 1,191 MD-80s were delivered from 1980 to 1999.

The MD-90 was developed from the MD-80 series. It was launched in 1989 and first flew in 1993. The MD-90 was longer and featured a glass cockpit (electronic instrumentation) and more powerful, quieter, fuel-efficient IAE V2525-D5 engines, with the option of upgrading to an IAE V2528 engine. A total of 116 MD-90 airliners were delivered.

MD-95
The MD-95 traces its history back to 1983 when McDonnell Douglas outlined a study named the DC-9-90. During the early 1980s, as production of the DC-9 family moved away from the smaller Series 30 towards the larger Super 80 (later redesignated MD-80) variants, McDonnell Douglas proposed a smaller version of the DC-9 to fill the gap left by the DC-9-30. The aircraft was proposed with a  thrust version of the JT8D-200 series engine, although the CFM International CFM56-3 was also considered. Seating up to 117 passengers, the DC-9-90 was to be equipped with the DC-9's wing with  tip extensions, rather than the more heavily modified increased area of the MD-80.

The DC-9-90 was designed to meet the needs of the newly deregulated American airline industry. However, its development was postponed by the recession of the early 1980s. When McDonnell Douglas did develop a smaller version of the MD-80, it simply shrunk the aircraft to create the MD-87, rather than offer a lower thrust, lighter aircraft that was more comparable to the DC-9-30. With its relatively high MTOW and powerful engines, the MD-87 essentially became a special mission aircraft and could not compete with the all new 100-seaters then being developed. Although an excellent aircraft for specialized roles, the MD-87 often was not sold on its own. Relying on its commonality factor, sales were generally limited to existing MD-80 operators.

In 1991, McDonnell Douglas revealed that it was again considering developing a specialized 100-seat version of the MD-80, initially named the MD-87-105 (105 seats). It was to be some  shorter than the MD-87, powered with engines in the  thrust class. McDonnell Douglas, Pratt & Whitney, and the China National Aero-Technology Import Export Agency signed a memorandum of understanding to develop a 105-seat version of the MD-80. At the 1991 Paris Airshow, McDonnell Douglas announced the development of a 105-seat aircraft, designated MD-95. The new name was selected to reflect the anticipated year deliveries would begin. McDonnell Douglas first offered the MD-95 for sale in 1994.

In early 1994, the MD-95 re-emerged as similar to the DC-9-30, its specified weight, dimensions, and fuel capacity being almost identical. At this time, McDonnell Douglas said that it expected the MD-95 to become a family of aircraft with the capability of increased range and seating capacity. The MD-95 was developed to satisfy the market need to replace early DC-9s, then approaching 30 years old. The MD-95 was a complete overhaul, going back to the original DC-9-30 design and applying new engines, cockpit and other more modern systems.

In March 1995, longtime McDonnell Douglas customer Scandinavian Airlines System (SAS) chose the Boeing 737-600 for its 100-seater over the MD-95. In October 1995, U.S. new entrant and low-cost carrier ValuJet signed an order for 50 MD-95s, plus 50 options. McDonnell Douglas president Harry Stonecipher felt that launching MD-95 production on the basis of this single order held little risk, stating that further orders would "take a while longer". The ValuJet order was the only order received for some two years.

Engines
As first proposed, the MD-95 was to be powered by a  thrust derivative of the JT8D-200 series with the Rolls-Royce Tay 670 also considered as an alternative. This was confirmed in January 1992, when Rolls-Royce and McDonnell Douglas signed a memorandum of understanding concerning the Tay-powered MD-95. McDonnell Douglas said that the MD-95 project would cost only a minimal amount to develop, as it was a direct offshoot of the IAE-powered MD-90.

During 1993 McDonnell Douglas seemed to be favoring a life extension program of the DC-9-30, under the program name DC-9X, to continue its presence in the 100-120 seat market, rather than concentrating on the new build MD-95. In its evaluation of the engine upgrades available for the DC-9X, McDonnell Douglas found that the BMW Rolls-Royce BR700 engine to be the ideal candidate, and on February 23, 1994, the BR700 was selected as the sole powerplant for the airliner.

Production site

McDonnell Douglas was planning for MD-95 final assembly to be undertaken in China, as an offshoot of the Trunkliner program, for which McDonnell Douglas had been negotiating to have up to 150 MD-90s built in China. The MD-90 Trunkliner deal was finalized in June 1992, but the contract was for a total of 40 aircraft, including 20 MD-80Ts and 20 -90Ts. The MD-80 has been license built in Shanghai since the 1980s. However, in early 1993, MDC said that it was considering sites outside China, and was later seeking alternative locations for the assembly line. In 1994, McDonnell Douglas sought global partners to share development costs. It also began a search for a low-cost final assembly site. Halla Group in South Korea was selected to make the wings; Alenia of Italy the entire fuselage; Aerospace Industrial Development Corp. of Taiwan, the tail; ShinMaywa of Japan, the horizontal stabilizer; and a manufacturing division of Korean Air Lines, the nose and cockpit.

On November 8, 1994, McDonnell Douglas announced that final assembly would be taken away from the longtime Douglas plant at Long Beach Airport, California. Instead, it selected a modifications and maintenance operation, Dalfort Aviation in Dallas, Texas, to assemble the MD-95. In early 1995, management and unions in Long Beach reached an agreement to hold down wage costs for the life of the MD-95 program and McDonnell Douglas canceled the preliminary agreement with Dalfort.

Rebranding and marketing
After McDonnell Douglas was acquired by Boeing in August 1997, most industry observers expected that Boeing would cancel development of the MD-95. However, Boeing decided to go forward with the design under a new name, Boeing 717. While it appeared that Boeing had skipped the 717 model designation when the 720 and the 727 followed the 707, the 717 name was the company's model number for the C-135 Stratolifter military transport and KC-135 Stratotanker tanker aircraft. 717 had also been used to promote an early design of the 720 to airlines before it was modified to meet market demands. A Boeing historian notes that the Air Force tanker was designated "717-100" and the commercial airliner designated "717-200".  The lack of a widespread use of the 717 name left it available for rebranding the MD-95.

At first Boeing had no more success selling the 717 than McDonnell Douglas. Even the original order for 50 was no certainty in the chaotic post-deregulation United States airline market. Assembly started on the first 717 in May 1997. The aircraft had its roll out ceremony on June 10, 1998. The 717's first flight took place on September 2, 1998. Following flight testing, the airliner was awarded a type certification on September 1, 1999. Its first delivery was in September 1999 to AirTran Airways, which Valujet was now called. Commercial service began the following month. Trans World Airlines (TWA) ordered 50 717s in 1998 with an option for 50 additional aircraft.

Boeing's decision to go ahead with the 717 slowly began to pay off. Early 717 operators were delighted with the reliability and passenger appeal of the type and decided to order more. The small Australian regional airline Impulse took a long-term lease on five 717s in early 2000 to begin an expansion into mainline routes. The ambitious move could not be sustained in competition with the majors, and Impulse sold out to Qantas in May 2001.

Within a few months, the 717's abilities became clear to Qantas, being faster than the BAe 146, and achieving a higher dispatch reliability, over 99%, than competing aircraft. Maintenance costs are low: according to AirTran Airways, a C check inspection, for example, takes three days and is required once every 4,500 flying hours. (For comparison, its predecessor, the DC-9 needed 21 days for a C check.) The new Rolls-Royce BR715 engine design is relatively easy to maintain. Many 717 operators, such as Qantas, became converts to the plane; Qantas bought more 717s to replace its BAe 146 fleet, and other orders came from Hawaiian Airlines and Midwest Airlines.

Boeing actively marketed the 717 to a number of large airlines, including Northwest Airlines, who already operated a large fleet of DC-9 aircraft, and Lufthansa. Boeing also studied a stretched, higher-capacity version of the 717, to have been called 717-300, but decided against proceeding with the new model, fearing that it would encroach on the company's 737-700 model. Production of the original 717 continued. Boeing continued to believe that the 100-passenger market would be lucrative enough to support both the 717 and the 737-600, the smallest of the Next-Generation 737 series. While the aircraft were similar in overall size, the 737-600 was better suited to long-distance routes, while the lighter 717 was more efficient on shorter, regional routes.

Assembly line and end of production
In 2001, Boeing began implementing a moving assembly line for production of the 717 and 737. The moving line greatly reduced production time, which led to lower production costs. Following the slump in airline traffic caused by an economic downturn subsequent to the terrorist attacks on September 11, 2001, Boeing announced a review of the type's future. After much deliberation, it was decided to continue with production. Despite the lack of orders, Boeing had confidence in the 717's fundamental suitability to the 100-seat market, and in the long-term size of that market. After 19 worldwide 717 sales in 2000, and just 6 in 2001, Boeing took 32 orders for the 717 in 2002, despite the severe industry downturn. The 100th 717 was delivered to AirTran Airways on June 18, 2002.

Increased competition from regional jets manufactured by Bombardier and Embraer took a heavy toll on sales during the airline slump after 2001. American Airlines acquired TWA and initially planned to continue the 717 order. American Airlines canceled TWA's order for Airbus A318s, but eventually also canceled the Boeing 717s that had not yet been delivered. The beginning of the end came in December 2003 when Boeing failed to reach a US$2.7 billion contract from Air Canada, a long term DC-9 customer, who chose the Embraer E-Jets and Bombardier CRJ200 over the 717. On January 14, 2005, citing slow sales, Boeing announced that it planned to end production of the 717 after it had met all of its outstanding orders.

The 156th and final 717 rolled off the assembly line in April 2006 for AirTran Airways, which was the 717's launch customer as well as its final customer. The final two Boeing 717s were delivered to customers AirTran Airways and Midwest Airlines on May 23, 2006. The 717 was the last commercial airplane produced at Boeing's Long Beach facility in Southern California.

Program milestones
Announced: June 16, 1991, at the Paris Air Show as MD-95 program by McDonnell Douglas
Approval to offer: July 22, 1994, McDonnell Douglas received board approval to offer the aircraft.
First order: October 10, 1995, from ValuJet (later to become AirTran Airways) for 50 firm and 50 options for MD-95s
Roll out: June 10, 1998, at Long Beach, California
First flight: September 2, 1998
Certification: FAA: September 1, 1999; EASA (JAA): September 16, 1999
Entry into service: October 12, 1999, with AirTran Airways on Atlanta-Washington, D.C. (Dulles) route
Last delivery: May 23, 2006, to AirTran Airways.

Design

The 717 features a two-crew glass cockpit that incorporates six interchangeable liquid-crystal-display units and advanced Honeywell VIA 2000 computers. The cockpit design is called Advanced Common Flightdeck (ACF) and is shared with the MD-10 and MD-11. Flight deck features include an Electronic Instrument System, a dual Flight Management System, a Central Fault Display System, and Global Positioning System. Category IIIb automatic landing capability for bad-weather operations and Future Air Navigation Systems are available. The 717 shares the same type rating as the DC-9, such that the FAA approved transition courses for DC-9 and analog MD-80 pilots could be completed in 11 days.

In conjunction with Parker Hannifin, MPC Products of Skokie, Illinois designed a fly-by-wire technology mechanical control suite for the 717 flight deck. The modules replaced much cumbersome rigging that had occurred in previous DC-9/MD-80 aircraft. The Rolls-Royce BR715 engines are completely controlled by an electronic engine system (Full Authority Digital Engine Control — FADEC) developed by BAE Systems, offering improved controllability and optimization. The engine has significantly lower fuel consumption compared to other engines of the equivalent amount of thrust.

Like its DC-9/MD-80/MD-90 predecessors, the 717 has a 2+3 seating arrangement in the main economy class, providing only one middle seat per row, whereas other single-aisle twin jets, such as the Boeing 737 family and the Airbus A320 family, often have 3+3 arrangement with two middle seats per row. Unlike its predecessors, McDonnell Douglas decided not to offer the MD-95/717 with the boarding flexibility of aft airstairs, with the goal of maximizing fuel efficiency through the reduction and simplification of as much auxiliary equipment as possible.

Variants

717-200
Production variant powered by either two Rolls-Royce BR715A1-30 or BR715C1-30 engines with 134 passenger seat, 155 built.
717 Business Express
 Proposed corporate version of 717-200, unveiled at the EBACE Convention in Geneva, Switzerland in May 2003. The version complements BBJ family.
717-100 (-100X)
 Proposed 86-seat version, formerly MD-95-20; four frames shorter. Renamed 717-100X; wind tunnel tests began in early 2000; revised mid-2000 to eight-frame shrink. Launch decision was deferred in December 2000 and again thereafter to an undisclosed date. Shelved by mid-2003.
717-100X Lite
 Proposed 75-seat version, powered by Rolls-Royce Deutschland BR710 turbofans; later abandoned.
717-300X
AirTran expressed interest in converting some -200 options to this model. Was under consideration late 2003 by Star Alliance Group (Air Canada, Austrian Airlines, Lufthansa and SAS); interest was reported from Delta, Iberia and Northwest Airlines.

Operators

, there were 103 Boeing 717s in service with Delta Air Lines (64), QantasLink (20), and Hawaiian Airlines (19), down from 148 aircraft in 2018.

Delta Air Lines is currently the largest operator of the 717, flying nearly 60 percent of all in-service jets, but did not purchase any of the planes new from Boeing. In 2013, Delta began leasing the entire fleet of 88 jets previously operated by AirTran Airways from Southwest Airlines, who had purchased AirTran, but wanted to preserve its all-Boeing 737 fleet rather than taking on another class of aircraft.  For Delta, used Boeing 717 and MD-90s allowed them to retire their DC-9s while also being cheaper to acquire than buying brand-new jets from Airbus or Boeing. Unlike other mainline US legacy carriers, Delta has decided that its best path to profitability is a strategy that utilizes older aircraft, and Delta has created a very extensive MRO (maintenance, repair and overhaul) organization, called TechOps, to support them.

In 2015, Blue1 announced it would sell its 717 fleet, with five jets going to Delta and four going to the then third largest operator of the type, Volotea, a Spanish low-cost carrier.

In January 2021, Volotea retired their last of formerly 19 Boeing 717s. It was the last remaining European operator of the type.

Orders and deliveries

Accidents and incidents 
, the Boeing 717 has been involved in five aviation accidents and incidents but with no hull-losses and no fatalities. The major incidents included one on-ground collision while taxiing, an emergency landing where the nose landing gear did not extend, and one attempted hijacking.

Specifications

See also

Notes

References

Further reading

 
 
 
 

 
717
McDonnell Douglas aircraft
1990s United States airliners
Twinjets
T-tail aircraft
Aircraft first flown in 1998